Patrick Paul Zachry (born April 24, 1952) is an American former professional baseball pitcher.

Early years
Zachry was drafted by the Cincinnati Reds in the nineteenth round of the 1970 Major League Baseball draft. In six seasons in their farm system, he compiled a 54-42 record, even 3.00 earned run average and 619 strikeouts.

Cincinnati Reds
The reigning World Series champion Reds dealt starting pitcher Clay Kirby to the Montreal Expos for third baseman Bob Bailey at the  Winter Meetings in order to make room in their rotation for Zachry. Though he made his debut on April 11,  out of the bullpen, he was moved into the starting rotation shortly afterwards. On May 28, he shut out the Los Angeles Dodgers to improve to 4-0 with a 1.17 ERA. For the season, Zachry compiled a 14-7 record, 2.74 ERA, and a team leading 143 strikeouts in 204 innings pitched.

In the post-season, Zachry won game two of the 1976 National League Championship Series against the Philadelphia Phillies in Veterans Stadium, and game three of the 1976 World Series with the New York Yankees at Yankee Stadium, both by a final score of 6-2.

The "Big Red Machine" became the first team to sweep the entire post-season since the Championship Series were begun in 1969, en route to winning their second consecutive world championship. After the season, Zachry had a hernia operation, and was in the process of recovering when he and San Diego Padres closer Butch Metzger were named co-winners of the National League Rookie of the Year Award. It was the first time in major league history co-winners of the award were named. Zachry was also the first ever Rookie of the Year Award winning pitcher to start and win a World Series game during his rookie season.

The hernia, coupled with a sore elbow, delayed Zachry's  Spring training, and denied him the opening day start. He did not pitch until the fifth game of the season against the Houston Astros. He gave up three runs in his first inning of work. In the month of May, Zachry was 0-4 with a 9.85 ERA. Following an 8-0 loss to Tom Seaver and the New York Mets at Shea Stadium on June 7, Zachry's record fell to 3-7 with a 5.19 ERA.

New York Mets
Seaver, meanwhile, was in a contract dispute with Mets chairman M. Donald Grant, and had requested a trade. On June 15, 1977, Zachry, Doug Flynn, Steve Henderson and Dan Norman were traded to the Mets in exchange for Seaver; the Beaver County Times wrote that Zachry was the "principal figure" acquired by the Mets in the deal.

Zachry's poor season continued in New York, as he lost his first two decisions to fall to 3-9 combined. A four hit gem against the Montreal Expos on July 10 signaled a return to form for Zachry. Over the rest of the season, Zachry went 7-4 with a 3.53 ERA, and was the only Mets starting pitcher to post a winning record (7-6) besides Seaver (7-3).

Zachry was masterful to start his first full season as a Met. After defeating his former club on April 30, he finished the first month of the  season with a 3-0 record and 1.85 ERA. A complete game victory over Tommy Lasorda's Los Angeles Dodgers on June 7 improved his record to 7-1, and convinced Lasorda to add Zachry as the sole Mets representative on the National League All-Star team (he did not appear in the game).

On July 24, the Cincinnati Reds came to Shea Stadium with Pete Rose entering the game with a 36-game hitting streak. Zachry held Rose hitless in his first three at-bats, but Rose ultimately tied Tommy Holmes' N.L. record 37 game streak with a single to left in the seventh inning. Four batters later, Zachry was pulled in favor of Kevin Kobel. Frustrated, Zachry went to kick a batting helmet sitting on the dugout steps, missed, and kicked the step. He suffered contusions in his left foot, and left on crutches. He was lost for the remainder of the season.

Despite the fact that his  season was also marred by injuries, Zachry was 5-0 with a 2.89 ERA before suffering his first loss and a season-ending injury on June 8 against the Houston Astros. He would not return to the mound until May of the following season, but managed to stay healthy over the remainder of the  season. He logged 164.2 innings pitched, his most as a Met, and pitched well in spite of his 6-10 record. His 3.01 ERA was tops among Mets starters, however, he suffered from a lack of run support. The Mets were shut out in each of Zachry's last three decisions, and five times in his 26 starts. On July 25 and July 30, Zachry shut out his opponent in consecutive starts. His streak would have hit three were it not for three unearned runs in the eighth inning of his next start.

Zachry shut out the Chicago Cubs at Wrigley Field in the  season opener. He won each of his first three starts, but then fell into a five-game losing streak in which his ERA was 6.93, and opposing batters hit .330. His record stood at 5-7 with a 4.16 ERA when the players' strike interrupted the season. On the first day of the strike, Zachry's wife, Sharron, gave birth to their son, Joshua. When play resumed, Zachry once again suffered from a lack of run support. The Mets scored one run or less in four of Zachry's eleven starts in the second half. As a result, he went 2-7 to give him a league leading fourteen losses for the season (tied with Steve Mura of the San Diego Padres).

In his first start of the  season, Zachry seemed destined to top his opening day performance from a year ago. Once again facing the Cubs at Wrigley, he took a no-hitter into the eighth inning. He walked lead-off batter Keith Moreland, but then retired the next two batters, and seemed to be on the verge of getting out of the inning unscathed. A walk to Tye Waller brought pinch hitter Bob Molinaro to the plate with runners on first and second. He laced a single to right to break up the no-hitter and the shut out. The Cubs went on to score four runs that inning, only one of them earned.

New Mets manager George Bamberger used Zachry as both a starter and reliever in 1982. He went 2-3 with a 2.11 ERA as a reliever, and earned his first career save on August 15 against the Cubs.

Los Angeles Dodgers
During the off season, the Mets traded Zachry to the Los Angeles Dodgers for Jorge Orta. In his two seasons with the Dodgers, Zachry pitched exclusively in relief, with the exception of one emergency start made in the second game of a doubleheader against the Mets at Shea on August 30,  (he held his former team scoreless for six innings before giving way to the bullpen). He ended his first season in Los Angeles with a 6-1 record and 2.49 ERA, and returned to the post season for the first time since his rookie season. He appeared in games three and four of the 1983 National League Championship Series, both won by the Philadelphia Phillies by final scores of 7-2. In four total innings pitched, he allowed one earned run and four hits, while striking out two.

Following a  campaign in which he went 5-6 with two saves and a 3.81 ERA, Zachry was dealt to the Phillies for slugging first baseman Al Oliver.

Philadelphia Phillies
With Kent Tekulve and Don Carman already in their bullpen, Zachry's role with the Phillies was very limited. After just ten appearances (mostly in losses), Zachry was released by the Phillies in June  with no decisions and a 4.26 ERA. Unable to land a job with another team, he retired and went into coaching.

Career stats

References

External links

, or Retrosheet, or SABR Biography Project, or The Ultimate Mets Database

1952 births
Living people
American expatriate baseball players in Venezuela
Baseball players from Texas
Cincinnati Reds players
Gulf Coast Reds players
Indianapolis Indians players
Los Angeles Dodgers players
Major League Baseball pitchers
Major League Baseball Rookie of the Year Award winners
National League All-Stars
New York Mets players
People from Richmond, Texas
Philadelphia Phillies players
Sioux Falls Packers players
St. Petersburg Pelicans players
Tampa Tarpons (1957–1987) players
Tigres de Aragua players
Trois-Rivières Aigles players